Project Zero 2: Wii Edition, known in Japan as  is a 2012 survival horror video game developed by Tecmo Koei Games and published by Nintendo for the Wii. The game is a remake of Fatal Frame II: Crimson Butterfly (2003), following sisters Mio and Mayu Amakura as they are trapped in a ghost-filled village cursed by a failed ritual. Gameplay follows Mio as she explores the village searching for Mayu, fighting hostile ghosts using the series' recurring Camera Obscura. The game includes new endings, and a arcade minigame.

Original director Makoto Shibata and producer Keisuke Kikuchi reprised their roles, creating a remake of Crimson Butterfly using unused concepts from the development of Fatal Frame: Mask of the Lunar Eclipse (2008). The gameplay was reworked based on Mask of the Lunar Eclipse, and the characters and environments redesigned. Singer-songwriter Tsuki Amano returned to provide a new theme song. While released in Japan and PAL regions, it was not released in North America. The game saw generally positive reviews from journalists.

Content and gameplay
Project Zero 2: Wii Edition is a survival horror in which the player controls Mio Amakura as she searches for her twin sister Mayu in the haunted Minakami Village. The game is a remake of Fatal Frame II: Crimson Butterfly, released in 2003 for PlayStation 2 and the following year for Xbox with additional content. The storyline revolves around Mio and Mayu being drawn into the aftermath of a failed ritual where one twin must sacrifice another to restrain a dark power called the Hellish Abyss. The game has six endings, four of them carried over from the original game and its Xbox port, gained either on different difficulties, watching certain in-game events, or completing battle scenes within a given time limit.

Basic gameplay is carried over from the original. Mio explores Minakami Village, solving puzzles and fighting hostile ghosts to progress through the game. She can pick up progression items and resources including health restoratives and film types serving as ammunition for the series' recurring Camera Ocscura. Using the Camera Obscure when ghosts appear, the game switches to a first-person perspective. Greater damage is dealt when a ghost is caught at chose range, in mid-attack, or when multiple ghosts are caught in the same shot. The Camera Obscura can be upgraded using lenses found during the game, and points earned by both defeating hostile ghosts and capturing non-hostile ghosts which briefly appear.

Unlike the overhead fixed-perspective camera of the original, Project Zero 2: Wii Edition uses an over-the-shoulder camera similar to Resident Evil 4. The controls are adjusted for the Wii Remote and Nunchuck, incorporating motion control elements for controlling the Camera Obscura and aiming a torch in earlier parts of the game. An element carried over from Mask of the Lunar Eclipse is the need to hold the action button to interact with objects or pick up items. There is a chance for a ghost attack. A new game mode is "Haunted House", a first-person on-rails experience where players must remain still while holding the Wii controls while ghosts appear to scare the player.

Development and release

Following completion of Fatal Frame: Mask of the Lunar Eclipse (2008) for the Wii, which saw extensive gameplay and design changes compared to earlier Fatal Frame titles, series creators Makoto Shibata and Keisuke Kikuchi decided to remake one of the earlier games in the style of Mask of the Lunar Eclipse. The team also had several leftover ideas that were not implemented into Mask of the Lunar Eclipse, allowing the team to also expand upon and improve their new systems using the remake. Production began in 2010 after the team had settled on their production goals of reworking Crimson Butterfly. Shibata and Kikuchi returned respectively as lead director and producer. Nintendo's Toru Osawa and Toshiharu Izuno were respective co-director and co-publisher, and co-programmers. Shibata had previously worked with Osawa and Izuno on Mask of the Lunar Eclipse. The team polished and expanded the "Touch System", where players hold a button to pick up items, to make the experience more unsettling. Due to the change in camera angle, the environment needed to be fully redesigned.

The Haunted House mini-game was included at Shibata's suggestion, going from a mode with ties into the main story to a self-contained bonus mode. It partly emerged during testing of the Minakami Village environment. The art design was reworked for the remake, with lead characters Miu and Mayu being both reworked and made older and less "cute" under Kikuchi's guidance. The redesigns needed to take the camera angle into account, as Miu would not be see much from the front outside cutscenes. The team also included a new ghost character called Kureha, originally intended as playing a role in mini-games. Tsuki Amano, who created the original Crimson Butterfly ending theme "Chou", returned to create a new ending theme "Kurenai". Amano was not surprised when approached by Shibata, as she both knew of the remake's development well in advance and enjoyed working on the series. She had some trouble creating a new theme, reusing her recurring string motif from theme songs after "Chou", and thinking of it as a "little sister" to the original theme.

The new endings were included at Kikuchi's wish, who originally wanted a new happy ending. Shibata was unable to think up suitable scenarios, so Kikuchi changed his request to a tragic ending. Shibata's concepts were split between the two new endings, "Shadow Festival" and "Frozen Butterfly". The "Shadow Festival" ending was the happier of the two, as Mio and Mayu were together despite dying in the village. The "Frozen Butterfly" ending, where Mayu goes mad and kills Mio, was intended as the worst possible ending. The "Frozen Butterfly" title referenced a recurring motif in traditional haiku.

The game was announced in 2010 under the title Zero New Project. It was released in the region on 28 June 2012. The game was localized for PAL regions by Nintendo of Europe, with the characters being dubbed by British actors. The game was released in Australia and New Zealand on 28 June, and in Europe on 29 June. IT was published in all regions by Nintendo. The game was not released in North America, prompting lobbying attempts by fans inspired by the Operation Rainfall campaign.

Reception

IGN called the game "an enduring classic that every horror fan should have in their collection". Nintendo Gamer called it "the best horror game on Wii, by some margin."

Notes and citations
References

Citations

Footnotes

External links

 Official website (Japan) 
 Official website (Europe) 
 Official website (Australia)  

2012 video games
2010s horror video games
Fatal Frame games
Mass murder in fiction
Psychological horror games
Fiction about sacrifices
Tecmo games
Twins in fiction
Video game remakes
Video games about insects
Video games developed in Japan
Video games set in 1988
Wii games
Wii games re-released on the Nintendo eShop
Wii-only games
Single-player video games